The Beethoven Quartet (Strunnyĭ kvartet imeni Betkhovena) was a string quartet founded between 1922 and 1923 by graduates of the Moscow Conservatory: violinists Dmitri Tsyganov and Vasily Shirinsky, violist Vadim Borisovsky and cellist Sergei Shirinsky (half brother of Vasily). In 1931, they changed their name from the Moscow Conservatory Quartet to the Beethoven Quartet. In the course of its fifty-year history, the Quartet performed more than six hundred works and recorded more than two hundred Russian and international classical works.

From 1938, it collaborated closely with the composer Dmitri Shostakovich and premiered thirteen of his fifteen string quartets, Nos. 2 through 14. He dedicated his third and fifth quartets to the Beethoven Quartet, while later quartets were dedicated individually to the members: Quartet No. 11 to the memory of Vasily Shirinsky, Quartet No. 12 to Tsyganov, Quartet No. 13 to Borisovsky, and Quartet No. 14 to Sergei Shirinsky. In addition to the string quartets, the Beethoven Quartet also premiered the Piano Quintet with the composer at the piano, and likewise the second piano trio with two of the Quartet's players.

Fyodor Druzhinin took over from Borisovsky in 1964, giving a runthrough of the ninth quartet with the rest of the group. Sergei Shirinsky died during rehearsals of Shostakovich's fifteenth quartet. In 1977, final founding member and first violinist Dmitri Tsyganov departed and was replaced by Oleh Krysa. The group disbanded in 1987.

Personnel
Dates indicate the years of activity.
Violin I
  (1923–1977)
 Oleh Krysa (1977–1990)

Violin II
  (1923–1965)
 Nikolai Zabavnikov (1965–1990)

Viola
 Vadim Borisovsky (1923–1964)
 Fyodor Druzhinin (1964–1988)
 Mikhail Kugel (1988–1990)

Cello
  (1923–1974), alternative spelling: Sergey
 Yevgeny Altman, alternative spellings: Evgeny Altman or Al'tman
 
  (1988–1990)

References

External links
Unofficial website and discography

Russian string quartets